Rettendon is a small village and civil parish in the Borough of Chelmsford in Essex, England, about  south east of the city of Chelmsford. Situated near the River Crouch, the village was once owned by the Bishop of Ely. The A130 formerly passed through the village. There are a number of listed buildings in the parish.

Education
Rettendon Primary School is located on the Main Road running through the village.

Hyde Hall
To the east of Rettendon, the garden at Hyde Hall was donated to the Royal Horticultural Society in 1993 and is open to the public.

Triple murders

On 6 December 1995, Rettendon was the scene of the murder of three drug dealers shot dead in a Range Rover down a small farm track.

References

External links 

 Rettendon Parish Council
 A Vision of Britain through time

City of Chelmsford
Villages in Essex